The 2023 President of the Chamber of Deputies of Brazil election took place on 1 February 2023, the day after the opening day of the 1st Session of the 57th Legislature of the National Congress, almost four months after the 2022 elections. It will result in the election of the President of the Chamber of Deputies, two vice presidents, the positions of 1st, 2nd, 3rd and 4th Secretaries and their respective replacements. They will hold a biennial term (2023-2025), making it impossible for them to be re-elected in the same Legislature - as established in Art. 5 of the Internal Regulations of the Chamber of Deputies.

The incumbent president, Arthur Lira was able to run for a second term and was re-elected. The election was carried out by secret ballot and electronic voting, requiring an absolute majority of votes, in the first ballot, and a simple majority, in the second ballot, with the absolute majority of the Deputies present. (Art. 7 of the Internal Regulations of the Chamber of Deputies)

Candidates

Confirmed candidates 

 Arthur Lira (PP-AL) - President of the Chamber of Deputies since 2021; Federal deputy for Alagoas since 2011; State deputy for Alagoas 1999−2011 and Councillor of Maceió 1993−99. Lira was elected president of the Chamber of Deputies in 2021 and will run for re-election in February 2023 for another two years in office. The federal deputy from Alagoas was elected to command the Chamber of Deputies with 302 votes in the last election. He was supported, at the time, by a coallition formed by 11 parties (PSL, PP, PSD, PL, Republicanos, PODE, PTB, PATRI, PSC, PROS and Avante) and took office shortly after the result was announced. In the last internal election, Lira faced candidates with a strong campaign, such as the national president of the Brazilian Democratic Movement (MDB), Baleia Rossi, a federal deputy for São Paulo. At the time, the deputy from Alagoas used the slogan “For the entire Chamber to have a voice”. 
 Chico Alencar (PSOL-RJ) - Councillor of Rio de Janeiro 1989−97 and 2021−23; Federal deputy for Rio de Janeiro 2003−19; and since 2023. State deputy for Rio de Janeiro 1999−2003. Alencar was a federal deputy for the state of Rio de Janeiro for four consecutive terms (from 2013 to 2019) and councilor of the city of Rio de Janeiro between January 2021 and February 2023, when he assumed his fifth term as a federal deputy. He was re-elected federal deputy in the 2022 general elections with 115,023 votes.  His candidacy was announced by the Socialism and Liberty Party on January 21, 2023. On social media, Alencar stated that his purpose was to “mark a position” against the current president of the Chamber of Deputies.
 Marcel van Hattem (NOVO-RS) - Councillor of Dois Irmãos 2005-09; State deputy for Rio Grande do Sul 2015-19 and Federal deputy for Rio Grande do Sul since 2019. His candidacy was announced on the eve of the election for the presidency of the Chamber of Deputies, on January 31, 2023. Van Hattem said that his candidacy is in opposition to Lula's government and the Workers' Party (PT), but independent of ties with the former President of Brazil, Jair Bolsonaro (PL). The candidate defended the resumption of anti-corruption agendas, such as the end of the parliamentary privilege, and said it was necessary to advance in economic reforms. He also said that the Chamber of Deputies needs to recover its protagonism side by side with the Judiciary and the Executive. He also said he was “concerned” with actions linked to alleged physiology in the Chamber. His candidacy was supported by his own part and some member of Podemos (PODE), like the former prosecutor of the Operation Car Wash, Deltan Dallagnol.

Formal voting

References 

2023 elections in Brazil
February 2023 events in Brazil
President of the Chamber of Deputies of Brazil elections